The 1993 Women's World Open Squash Championship was the women's edition of the 1993 World Open, which serves as the individual world championship for squash players. The event took place in Johannesburg in South Africa between 21 September and 25 September 1993. Michelle Martin won her first World Open title, defeating Liz Irving in the final.

Seeds

Draw and results

Notes
The retirement of Susan Devoy left Michelle Martin as the number one seed for the championships. Martin eased to victory winning the tournament without even dropping a single game.

See also
World Open
1993 Men's World Open Squash Championship

References

External links
Womens World Open

1993 in squash
World Squash Championships
Squash tournaments in South Africa
1993 in South African sport
1993 in women's squash
International sports competitions hosted by South Africa
1993 in South African women's sport